Potassium magnesium sulfate is a double salt that can crystallise in a number of forms that occur as minerals.

Langbeinite K2Mg2(SO4)3
Leonite K2Mg(SO4)2·4H2O
Picromerite K2Mg(SO4)2·6H2O

Sulfates
Magnesium compounds
Potassium compounds